Ivory Coast competed at the 2019 World Aquatics Championships in Gwangju, South Korea from 12 to 28 July.

Swimming

Ivory Coast has entered three swimmers.

Men

Women

References

Nations at the 2019 World Aquatics Championships
Ivory Coast at the World Aquatics Championships
World Aquatics Championships